The Zhanjiang dialect is a dialect mostly spoken in Zhanjiang in Guangdong, China. It is a sub-dialect of Leizhou Min. It is considered to be part  of Southern Min though it has little mutual intelligibility with Minnan Proper (Hokkien-Taiwanese) and Teochew.

See also
Varieties of Chinese

References 

Guangdong
Southern Min